Antony Paul Wray (born 2 November 1961) is a British businessman. He is the former Chief Executive of Severn Trent plc, a British water company.

Early life
Wray grew up on a Leicester council estate.

He has a BSc degree.

Career
Wray was the Chief Executive of Severn Trent from 2 October 2007 to 11 April 2014. He was succeeded by Liv Garfield.

References

1961 births
Living people
British chief executives
British corporate directors